Qiqqa (pronounced "Quicker") is a free and open-source software that allows researchers to work with thousands of PDFs. It combines PDF reference management tools, a citation manager, and a mind map brainstorming tool. It integrates with Microsoft Word XP, 2003, 2007 and 2010 and BibTeX/LaTeX to automatically produce citations and bibliographies in thousands of styles. 

The development of Qiqqa began in Cambridge, UK, in December 2009. A public alpha was released in April 2010, offering PDF management and brainstorming capabilities. Subsequent releases have seen the incorporation of the Web Library, OCR, integration with BibTeX and other reference managers, and the use of natural language processing (NLP) techniques to guide researchers in their reading.

Shortly after its release, Qiqqa has been noticed by universities and their libraries.

In 2011, Qiqqa won both the University of Cambridge CUE and CUTEC, and the Cambridge Wireless Discovering Start-Ups   competitions. Qiqqa was an award winner in the 2012 Santander Universities Entrepreneurship Awards.

In 2020, Qiqqa decided to change software pricing model and make it free and open-source: "After 10 years of your support we have decided to make Qiqqa open source so that it can be grown and extended by its community of thousands of active users."

Qiqqa does not seem to have attracted a large user base, compared to other recent reference management programs developed from 2006 to date.

See also
Comparison of reference management software
Computer-assisted qualitative data analysis software

References

External links

Document management systems
Free BibTeX software
Free note-taking software
Free reference management software
Mind-mapping software
Note-taking software
PDF readers
QDA software
Reference management software
Software that uses XUL